Corey Soljan (born 30 July 1987 in Sydney), better known by his artistic name Code Black, is an Australian hardstyle-DJ and music producer.

As a member of the act Bioweapon, along with Audiofreq, he travelled the world. Finding success in the Netherlands, he began a solo career stopping his duo act in 2011. His initial claim to fame was with "Red Planet" in 2011 and "Can't Hold Me Back" in 2012. He has played at various events including Mysteryland, Tomorrowland, HardBass, Decibel, Euphoria and both of the Defqon.1 music festivals held in The Netherlands and Australia. He mainly produces and plays euphoric hardstyle tracks, but also produces and plays some rawstyle tracks.

Code Black's solo career began when he was signed to the label Fusion Records at the end of 2011. His first solo release, "Red Planet" in the same year, had great success within the hardstyle community. Arguably his most successful release, "Brighter Day" in 2013, reached number 28 on the Dutch Dance Chart.

In 2013, he was listed as the 15th best DJ on the Australian "National Top 50 DJs" list. In addition, he joined Brennan Heart's label, WE R Music. In 2014, he was listed in DJ Mag's list for the first time as a new entry at number 92 and was named as "a breakout artist" by Outbreak.

In 2015, Bioweapon got back together for a short tour after 4 years of silence.
Today, it is part of the "I am hardstyle" label with Brennan Heart, Toneshifterz, The Pitcher and Aftershock.

Discography

Albums 
 2019 
 Journey

EPs 
 2012 
 Activated / Your Moment (with Wasted Penguinz)

 2018 
 Chapter 1
 Chapter 2
 Chapter 3

Singles 
 2011 
 Visions
 Red Planet

 2012 
 F.E.A.R.
 Can't Hold Me Back
 About The Music

 2013 
 Brighter Day
 R.E.V.O.L.U.T.I.O.N.
 I.N.C.O.N.T.R.O.L.
 Feels Good

 2014 
 Pandora
 Tonight Will Never Die (with Brennan Heart)
 Accelerate (Official XXlerator Anthem 2014) (with Atmozfears)
 Starting Over (with Atmozfears)
 Unleash The Beast (Defqon.1 Australia Anthem 2014)
 Tonight Will Never Die (Audiotricz Remix) (with Brennan Heart)

 2015 
 Draw Me Closer
 Accelerate (Darren Styles Edit) (with Atmozfears)
 New World (ft. Chris Madin)
 End Like This (with Wasted Penguinz, ft. Insali)
 Kick It Up Now (with Toneshifterz)
 Triangle
 Predator

 2016 
 See The Light (with Da Tweekaz and Paradise)
 Dragonblood (Defqon.1 Australia Anthem 2016) (with Audiofreq and Toneshifterz)
 Are You Ready

 2017 
 Wild Ones
 Broken (with Brennan Heart and Jonathan Mendelsohn)

 2018 
 Sparks (with Darren Styles)

 2019 
 GTFO (with Hard Driver)

 2020 
 Shake Ya Shimmy (with Da Tweekaz)
 F*CK YEAH!!! (with Timmy Trumpet, Will Sparks, and Toneshifterz) 
 All Or Nothing (whit Atmozfears and Toneshifterz)

On Albums 
 2018 
 Before You Go (with Toneshifterz, on Toneshifterz - Shifting To The Source)

On Compilations 
 2012 
 About The Music (with Toneshifterz, on Hard With Style)

 2013 
 Running Late (Brennan Heart & Code Black MF Earthquake Rawmix) (with Brennan Heart, on Be Yourself Dance Vol. 2)

 2016 
 Survive (with DV8 Rocks! and Zany, on Gary D. pres. 50 D.Techno Traxx)

Remixes 
 2012 
 Black & White - Get Ya Hands Up

 2017 
 Gareth Emery ft. Christina Novelli - Concrete Angel (with Coone)

 2020 
 Let There Be Light, Code Black remix (with Audiotricz)

References

External links 

 Facebook
 Discogs

Hardstyle musicians
Australian electronic musicians
1987 births
Living people